is a station in southeast Tokyo, Japan. It is a located in Ōta Ward, about a 20-minute walk away from Tamagawa and a 30 minute-walk from Den-en-chōfu.

Station layout
One island platform.

History 
May 1923 Yukigaya Station(雪ヶ谷駅) opened as a station of Ikegami Electric Railway. The station then was placed several hundred meters towards Gotanda.
August 1927 Chofu-Otsuka Station(調布大塚駅) opened near the present train depot.
June 1, 1933 Yukigaya Station and Chofu-Otsuka Station was merged into Yukigaya Station placed on the present station position.
December 1943 Renamed to Yukigaya-Otsuka Station(雪ヶ谷大塚駅).
January 20, 1966 Renamed to the present name.

Bus services 
 bus stop
Tokyu Bus
<蒲12> Kamata Sta. - Ikegami police station - Yukigaya - Den-en-chofu Sta.
<渋33> Shibuya Sta. - Ikejiri-Ohashi Sta. - Toritsudaigaku Sta. - Midorigaoka Sta. - Okusawa Station North Exit - Yukigaya - Tamagawa Sta.
<多摩01> Tokyo Medical Center - Toritsudaigaku Sta. - Okusawa Station North Exit - Yukigaya - Tamagawa Sta.

External links 
  Yukigayaootsuka Station (Tokyu)  

Railway stations in Tokyo
Tokyu Ikegami Line
Stations of Tokyu Corporation
Railway stations in Japan opened in 1923